The Centro Sportivo Aeronautica Militare is the sport section of the Italian Air Force.

Structure
Air Force athletes receive an Air Force rank and salary equivalent to servicemen. They also receive basic military training, although the majority of their training is sport-specific and usually takes place in one of the Air Force sports centers.

Sports

There are 12 disciplines of C.S. Aeronnatica Militare.

Fencing
Archery
Athletics
Artistic gymnastics
Rhythmic gymnastics
Equestrianism
Table Tennis
Shooting
Basketball
Volleyball
Beach Volleyball
Sailing

Notable athletes

Athletics
Andrew Howe
Emanuele Di Gregorio
Michael Tumi (former, from 2012 pass to G.S. Fiamme Gialle)
Manuela Levorato

Archery
Michele Frangilli
Mauro Nespoli
Marco Galiazzo

Fencing
Paolo Pizzo
Matteo Tagliariol
Andrea Baldini

Athletes at the 2012 Summer Olympics
Of the 290 athletes who represented Italy at the 2012 Summer Olympics, 29 were Air Force athletes. These athletes are:

See also
Italian Air Force
Italian military sports bodies

References

External links
 Official site

Athletics clubs in Italy
Sports organizations established in 1964
1964 establishments in Italy
Aeronautica Militare